The Nigeria Billie Jean King Cup team represents Nigeria in Billie Jean King Cup tennis competition and are governed by the Nigeria Tennis Federation.  They currently compete in the Europe/Africa Zone of Group III.

History
Nigeria competed in its first Billie Jean King Cup in 2021.  Their best result was finishing second in their Group III pool in 2021.

Team (2021)
Sarah Adegoke
Adesuwa Osabuohien
Oyinlomo Quadre

See also
Billie Jean King Cup
Nigeria Davis Cup team

External links

Billie Jean King Cup teams
Billie Jean King Cup
Billie Jean King Cup